Trichopsychoda is a genus of flies belonging to the family Psychodidae.

The species of this genus are found in Europe and Northern America.

Species:
 Trichopsychoda africanus Satchell, 1955 
 Trichopsychoda arunaudi Tokunaga, 1961

References

Psychodidae